"Together Stronger (C'mon Wales)" is a song by Manic Street Preachers, released as a single in May 2016. This song is the official song for the Wales national team ahead of UEFA Euro 2016. All profits from the single sales were given to the Princes Gate Trust and Tenovus Cancer Care. The song began life as a reworking of the Frankie Valli song, "Can't Take My Eyes Off You". After the publishers refused permission to use the song,
the band went and set the words to an original tune. 

On the week of its release, the single failed to make the UK top 100 through digital downloads yet managed to chart at No.1 through the physical single release.

Track listing

Personnel 
 Manic Street Preachers

 James Dean Bradfield – lead vocals, guitar
 Nicky Wire – vocals, bass guitar
 Sean Moore – drums

References

2016 singles
Manic Street Preachers songs
2016 songs
Songs written by Sean Moore (musician)
Songs written by Nicky Wire
Songs written by James Dean Bradfield
Football songs and chants
Wales at UEFA Euro 2016